Dionysus was a Swedish/German power metal band formed in 1999 by Sinergy drummer Ronny Milianowicz and disbanded in 2008.

Biography
Dionysus debut album Sign of Truth was recorded at the Rhön Studio in Fulda, Germany in 2002, which is best known for its productions with Edguy and Avantasia. The album was produced by Tobias Sammet and mixed by Tommy Newton (Keeper of the Seven Keys, Part 1 & 2). Dionysus second album, Anima Mundi ("the soul of the world" in Latin), was released in 2004.

Dionysus also works closely with HammerFall singer Joacim Cans. Ronny Milianowicz did the backing vocals on Legacy of Kings, and Joacim wrote the lyrics in "Bringer of Salvation" on the Sign of Truth album and "Bringer of War" on the Anima Mundi album. Ronny and Joacim also work together on a number of different projects, including the musical “The Conspiracy”.

Dionysus' third album, Fairytales and Reality was released on 23 August 2006.

In January 2007 co-founder, songwriter and drummer Ronny Milianowicz suddenly decided to quit the band for other engagements, though promising Dionysus support for all live activities of 2007. On 20 February keyboardist Kaspar Dahlqvist announced that he was leaving due to personal conflicts and he would not be participating in the upcoming tour.

On their MySpace page, bassist Nobby Noberg revealed that Dionysus had found a new drummer, Johannes Berg (Castillion) and a new keyboardist, Joakim Floke, which both went on Dionysus' 2007 European tour, supporting Jon Oliva's Pain.

In 2008, bassist Nobby Noberg and former drummer Ronny Milianowicz had their first release with their new band Saint Deamon, including singer Jan Thore Grefstad.

Ronny Milianowicz left the band in 2007 and was later followed by Kaspar Dahlqvist. Dionysus recruited new members but split up in 2008 anyway.

Members
 Olaf Hayer - vocals
 Johnny Öhlin - guitars
 Nobby Noberg - Bass
 Johannes Berg - drums
 Joakim Floke - keyboards

Former members
 Ronny Milianowicz - drums
 Kaspar Dahlqvist - keyboards

Timeline

Discography
Sign of Truth (2002)
Anima Mundi (2004)
Fairytales and Reality (2006)

Compilations
Keep the Spirit (2008)

References

External links
Dionysus at AFM Records

Swedish power metal musical groups
German power metal musical groups
German heavy metal musical groups
Musical groups established in 1999
Musical groups disestablished in 2008
1999 establishments in Sweden